The Six Days of Copenhagen is a six-day track cycling race held annually in Copenhagen, Denmark. The event was first held in 1934. The event is held at the Ballerup Super Arena since it was opened in 2001.

Winners

References

Cycle races in Denmark
Sports competitions in Copenhagen
Six-day races
Recurring sporting events established in 1934
1934 establishments in Denmark
Six Day Series